Pioneer Pass is a mountain pass in the central Baffin Mountains, Nunavut, Canada.

References

Arctic Cordillera
Mountain passes of Baffin Island